The second Nanda ministry was formed as an interim cabinet upon the death in office of Lal Bahadur Shastri on 11 January 1966.

Cabinet
Key
  Resigned

Cabinet ministers

|}

Ministers of State

|}

References

Indian union ministries
1966 establishments in India
1966 disestablishments in India
Cabinets established in 1966
Cabinets disestablished in 1966